Geniere has been borne by at least two ships of the Italian Navy and may refer to:

 , a  launched in 1938 and destroyed in 1943.
 , a  launched in 1942 as USS Prichett and transferred to Italy in 1970. She was scrapped in 1975.

Italian Navy ship names